Freedom of spirit may refer to:

Autonomous learning
Cognitive liberty
Critical consciousness
Freedom of religion
Freedom of thought
Free will
Meditation
Mental prayer
Spiritual experience